Labeo erythropterus is fish in genus Labeo from the Mekong basin, Java and Sumatra.

References 

 

Labeo
Fish described in 1842